Mary Elizabeth Hatten is the Frederick P. Rose Professor of neuroscience at the Rockefeller University, where she became the first female full professor in 1992. She studies the manner in which neurons migrate in the brain, which has implications for many neurological diseases, as well as cancer. Her research led to her being elected to the National Academy of Sciences in 2017.

Early life and education
Mary E. Hatten was born in Richmond, Virginia and grew up in Newport News, Virginia. Her father was an obstetrician. During high school and college, Hatten participated in research at the nearby NASA Langley Research Center.

She graduated from Hollins College, a women's college, with a bachelor's degree in chemistry in 1971. In 1975, earned a PhD from Princeton University, studying cell membrane biophysics with Max Burger, and following him to the University of Basel to finish her degree.

Career and research 
After her PhD, Hatten did postdoctoral research with Richard Sidman at Harvard Medical School from 1975 to 1978, studying neuron migration in the developing brain.

Hatten was a professor in the department of pharmacology at the New York University School of Medicine from 1978 to 1986. In 1986, she moved to the Columbia University College of Physicians and Surgeons, where she was a professor until 1992.

In 1992, Hatten became the first female professor at Rockefeller University.

Awards and honors
 1988 Pew Neuroscience Award
 1991 National Science Foundation Faculty Award for Women Scientists
 1996 Weil Award of the American Association of Neuropathologists
 2017 Ralph W. Gerard Prize in Neuroscience
 2017 Elected Member of the National Academy of Sciences
 2021 Elected Member of National Academy of Medicine (2021)

References 

Rockefeller University faculty
Princeton University alumni
Hollins University alumni
American neuroscientists
American women neuroscientists
Year of birth missing (living people)
Living people
Members of the United States National Academy of Sciences
Members of the National Academy of Medicine